Emanuel Ezequiel Pentimalli (born 10 October 1996) is an Argentine professional footballer who plays as a midfielder for Puerto Nuevo.

Career
Pentimalli's career started with Defensores Unidos. He made ninety-one appearances and scored two goals in his first three years with the club, which culminated with promotion to Primera B Metropolitana in 2017–18. His opening appearance in the second tier of Argentine football came on 19 August 2018 versus UAI Urquiza, with the midfielder appearing for the 100th time for Defensores Unidos in September against Fénix. His first goal at that level arrived versus Justo José de Urquiza in March 2019. Pentimalli was loaned out in 2019–20 to Acassuso. He made nine appearances before returning to his parent club.

In January 2022, Pentimalli joined Primera C Metropolitana side Puerto Nuevo.

Career statistics
.

Honours
Defensores Unidos
Primera C Metropolitana: 2017–18

References

External links

1996 births
Living people
Place of birth missing (living people)
Argentine footballers
Association football midfielders
Primera C Metropolitana players
Primera B Metropolitana players
Defensores Unidos footballers
Club Atlético Acassuso footballers
Club Atlético Puerto Nuevo players